The Bank deutscher Länder (Bank of German States), abbreviation BdL, was the first central bank for the Deutsche Mark. It was founded on 1 March 1948 and was replaced in 1957 by the Deutsche Bundesbank.

The main task of the BdL was to manage currency policy in the American and British occupation zones in Germany (Bizone). On 21 June 1948 the Bank deutscher Länder introduced the Deutsche Mark currency in the three western zones of occupation. On 1 November 1948, state central banks in the French zone, which had adopted the Deutsche Mark in June too, joined the BdL. In May 1949 the Federal Republic of Germany (West Germany) was founded, however, the BdL remained subject to the control of the three Western Allied powers—the United States, the United Kingdom and France until 1951. Later, BdL became an independent agency of the West German states, similar to the concept of independence displayed by the Federal Reserve System in the United States.

In the process of introducing the Deutsche Mark in 1948, the states' central banks (LZB), then entities of the individual German states, founded the Bank deutscher Länder as their subsidiary for the central purpose of issuing the new currency, avoiding thus conflicts among the states.

The capital stock of the BdL, 100,000 Deutsche Mark, was given by the LZB. When the BdL was established, 300 people worked there, but by 1949, their number had already increased to 1,450.  The headquarters of the BdL was located in Frankfurt am Main.

Institutions of the BdL were the board of directors and the Zentralbankrat (Central Banking Council), consisting of the nine presidents of the Landeszentralbanken. These officials elected the president of the board of directors, who then chose the other members of the board. The board's task was to enforce the resolutions of the Zentralbankrat.

Effective 1 August 1957, the BdL and the central banks of the German states were merged in the new Deutsche Bundesbank with the Landeszentralbanken transformed into mere subsidiaries of the Bundesbank in accordance with the Federal law establishing the Bundesbank.

See also

German mark
Deutsche Bundesbank

External links

Banks based in Frankfurt
Germany
Banks established in 1948
1948 establishments in Germany
1957 disestablishments in Germany
German companies established in 1948
Banks disestablished in 1957